Eusarca is a genus of moths in the family Geometridae described by Jacob Hübner in 1813.

Species
The following species are classified in the genus. This species list may be incomplete.
Eusarca argillaria
Eusarca confusaria – confused eusarca moth
Eusarca detractaria
Eusarca distycharia
Eusarca falcata
Eusarca fundaria – dark-edged eusarca moth
Eusarca galbanaria
Eusarca geniculata
Eusarca graceiaria
Eusarca lutzi
Eusarca packardaria – Packard's eusarca moth
Eusarca subcineraria
Eusarca subflavaria
Eusarca terraria
Eusarca tibiaria
Eusarca venosaria

References

Ourapterygini